The Journal of Periodontology is the academic journal of the American Academy of Periodontology (AAP). It was established in 1930.

It is dedicated to Dr. Gillette Hayden. According to the July 1933 Journal, "The Journal of Periodontology is lovingly dedicated to the memory of Doctor Gillette Hayden.  Her selfless devotion and untiring efforts in behalf of periodontia and the American Academy of Periodontology, have served as an inspiration to her close associates which can only be consummated by carrying onward the work for which she spent her life."

External links

 The Journal of Periodontology

References

Dentistry journals
Academic journals published by learned and professional societies of the United States
Periodontology
Publications established in 1930